The 1988 Preakness Stakes was the 113th running of the Preakness Stakes thoroughbred horse race. The race took place on May 21, 1988, and was televised in the United States on the ABC television network. Risen Star, who was jockeyed by Eddie Delahoussaye, won the race by one and one quarter lengths over runner-up Brian's Time.  Approximate post time was 5:34 p.m. Eastern Time. The race was run over a fast track in a final time of 1:56-1/5. The Maryland Jockey Club reported total attendance of 88,654, this is recorded as second highest on the list of American thoroughbred racing top attended events for North America in 1988.

Payout 

The 113th Preakness Stakes Payout Schedule

$2 Exacta:  (4–7) paid   $93.80

The full chart 

 Winning Breeder: Arthur B. Hancock III; (KY) 
 Final Time: 1:56.20
 Track Condition: Fast
 Total Attendance: 86,106

See also 

 1988 Kentucky Derby

References

External links 

 

1988
1988 in horse racing
1988 in American sports
1988 in sports in Maryland
Horse races in Maryland